Salussola railway station is the train station serving the comune of Salussola, in the Piedmont region, northwestern Italy. It is the junction of the Santhià–Biella.

The station is currently managed by Rete Ferroviaria Italiana (RFI). Train services are operated by Trenitalia.  Each of these companies is a subsidiary of Ferrovie dello Stato (FS), Italy's state-owned rail company.

History
The station was opened on 8 September 1856, upon the inauguration of the Santhià–Biella railway.

From 10 July 1951, with the end of the concession to the "Società Strade Ferrate di Biella (SFB)" company, the management of the railway line passed to the state and the exercise of the stations was assumed by Ferrovie dello Stato.

In the year 2000, the plant management passed to Rete Ferroviaria Italiana, which is classified in the category "Bronze".

Features
Two tracks of which are equipped with platforms.

Train services
The station is served by the following service(s):

Regional services (Treno regionale) Santhià - Biella San Paolo

See also

 History of rail transport in Italy
 List of railway stations in Piedmont
 Rail transport in Italy
 Railway stations in Italy

References

External links

Railway stations in Piedmont
Railway stations opened in 1856